Céline Nadine Sabine Deville (born 24 January 1982) is a French football player who has played as goalkeeper for Montpellier and various other top French clubs. Deville has also played for the senior women's national team having made her debut on 9 April 2002 in a friendly match against Australia.

Career statistics
Updated 1 September 2016

Honours

Official
Division 1 Féminine (Champions of France) (level 1)
Winners (4): 2003–04, 2004–05, 2011–12, 2012–13

Challenge de France
Winners (5): 2006, 2007, 2009, 2012, 2013

UEFA Women's Champions League: Winner 2011–12

Invitational
Pyrénées Cup
Winners (2): 2008, 2010

References

External links

 
 
  
 
 
 
 

1982 births
Living people
French women's footballers
France women's international footballers
Paris Saint-Germain Féminine players
Montpellier HSC (women) players
Olympique Lyonnais Féminin players
Paris FC (women) players
2011 FIFA Women's World Cup players
2015 FIFA Women's World Cup players
Footballers at the 2012 Summer Olympics
Olympic footballers of France
Sportspeople from Pas-de-Calais
Women's association football goalkeepers
Division 1 Féminine players
Footballers from Hauts-de-France